The James Slip Ferry was a ferry route connecting Lower Manhattan and Long Island City, Queens, New York City, United States, joining James Slip (Manhattan) and Hunter's Point (Queens) across the East River.

History
The ferry was established by May 1861, when the Long Island Rail Road was rerouted to Hunter's Point. It was discontinued on October 1, 1907.

See also
List of ferries across the East River

References

East River
Ferries of New York City
Long Island Rail Road